Nicholas Peter Schonert (born 20 September 1991) is a South African rugby union player. His playing position is prop. He represents Sale Sharks in the English Premiership.

He then joined  during the 2013 Vodacom Cup, making six appearances.

He was a member of the South Africa under 20 team that played in the 2011 IRB Junior World Championship and was also named in a South African Barbarians team to face Saracens.

After less than a season at the Cheetahs, however, Schonert signed for English Premiership side Worcester Warriors.

In May 2017 he was invited to a training camp with the senior England squad by Eddie Jones.

On 29 July 2021, Schonert leaves Worcester to sign for Premiership rivals Sale Sharks on a three-year contract from the 2021-22 season.

References

External links
 
 itsrugby.co.uk Profile

1991 births
Living people
Afrikaner people
Alumni of Maritzburg College
Expatriate rugby union players in England
Griquas (rugby union) players
Rugby union players from Durban
Rugby union props
Sharks (Currie Cup) players
South Africa Under-20 international rugby union players
South African expatriate rugby union players
South African expatriate sportspeople in England
South African people of German descent
South African rugby union players
Worcester Warriors players